The Sydney Basin is an interim Australian bioregion and is both a structural entity and a depositional area, now preserved on the east coast of New South Wales, Australia and with some of its eastern side now subsided beneath the Tasman Sea.  The basin is named for the city of Sydney, on which it is centred.

The basin is also home to the major centres of Newcastle and Wollongong, and contains economically significant reserves of coal.

Sydney's famous harbour and the sculptured cliffs of the Blue Mountains are signature formations of relatively hard upper strata of sandstone. The basin contains the UNESCO World Heritage-listed Greater Blue Mountains Area.

Geography
From Durras Lake the western boundary continues in a line through Lithgow to around Ulan (near Mudgee). To the east the basin continues to the edge of the continental shelf.

History and formation

Minor igneous activity took place in the basin during the Early Jurassic (i.e. 210 million years ago), Late Mesozoic (i.e. 100-90 million years ago) and Cenozoic eras (i.e. 65 million years ago). The Early Jurassic activity resulted in the formation of the Prospect dolerite intrusion in Prospect Hill. Although Jurassic sedimentation is not observed in the Sydney Basin, there are Jurassic volcanic breccia pipes (diatremes).

Onshore, the basin contains  of Permo-Triassic clastic sediments, while the offshore basin contains  of sediments. The basin overlies the Lachlan Fold Belt and Late Carboniferous volcanoclastic sediments. The basin formed during extension in the Early Permian, with half-graben infilled with the Dalwood and Talaterang Groups. Foreland loading followed with the compression of the Currarong Orogen in the Early Permian.

Late Permian uplift associated with the New England foreland loading phase resulted in the formation of depocentres with the northeast Sydney Basin with best preserved marine fossils. These depocentres filled with pyroclastic and alluvial-paludual sediments of the Newcastle Coal Measures. In the Triassic, uplift of the offshore basin resulted in reworking of Permian sediments in fluvial environments. The basin underwent a final phase of deformation (thrusting) in the Middle Triassic where it was uplifted to become dry land, with an erosion occurring from this time to the present.

Extension and breakup in the Tasman Sea beginning in the Late Cretaceous resulted in the current structural boundaries of the basin's eastern margin. In the south and west the Basin finishes in cliff lines formed on sandstones and conglomerates of the primary Permian sediments, with waterfalls being widespread on all escarpments.

Timeline

Permian: 299–252 million years ago; The settling and evolution of swamp forest, which would shape tremendous coal measures. To note, Australia's coal is younger than the Carboniferous coal of the Northern Hemisphere.
Early Triassic: 252–247 million years ago; dark, high-carbon Narrabeen shales can be viewed at Long Reef and Narrabeen.  The Australian continent was part of the Gondwana supercontinent and the Sydney basin was situated within a depositional basin. The Ashfield Shale, which overlies the Sydney sandstone, indicates an alteration in river flow direction and its depositional style. That was when southeast-streaming rivers deposited fine grained sands and muds within a river delta which settled on a shallow sea's shore. 
 Mid Triassic: 247–235 million years ago; A monolithic river with its beginnings to the south-west of Broken Hill, in what was Antarctica at that time, had its delta in what was the Sydney Basin. It is around five times bigger than the Amazon river. There is predominance of silica sand with minor lenses of clay. Plant fossils are scarce, but some fish fossils are found in the clay lenses.
Late Triassic: 235–201 million years ago; As the river slowed with the erosion of the mountain range, finer shales were laid out. This strata is rich in Glossopteris fern fossils.
End of Triassic: 201 million years ago; Ascension and shifting at the Lapstone fault, with the Blue Mountains rising and the western Sydney plain descending to a flat land and Sydney CBD jousting upward.
Jurassic: 201–145 million years ago; Erosion, with Ashfield Shales remaining on top. Deep V-shaped valleys in the Hawkesbury sandstone. Fracturing, volcanic intrusions form Prospect Quarry, Mount Tomah, Mount Wilson and Hornsby Quarry.
Cainozoic (Tertiary and Quaternary): 66 million years to present; Gondwana broke up around 40 to 60 million years ago. That is when the Australian continent started to form where it drifted and rifted, where Sydney's rocks were elevated, canted and then later eroded by the weather. Sydney's sedimentary rocks were shaped into a landscape that was defined by bedrock valleys exposed into a raised plateau. Sydney's largest rivers, such as the Hawkesbury, Parramatta, Georges and Hacking Rivers eroded the region's deepest valleys. In this period, the Ashfield Shale got weathered to create a flatter landform with low, undulating topography and reasonably fertile soils, which heavily contrasted the plateaus, cliffs and gorges on the sandstone areas in the Sydney Region. The Botany Bay Basin was also developed at that time, which is infilled with sand.
Late Pleistocene: 12 000 years ago; Submerging the Sydney river valleys with the post-glacial sea level rise where estuaries and deep harbours were formed.

Hydrology
The hydrology of the basin comprises three main drainage basins as defined by the New South Wales Office of Water that lie entirely or mainly within the geography of the basin; namely the Central Coast catchment, the Hawkesbury-Nepean catchment, and the Sydney Metropolitan catchment.

In addition, some of the rivers of the Hunter-Central Rivers catchment and the Southern Rivers catchment also lie mainly in the basin. In the Hunter-Central Rivers catchment, the Hunter River sub-catchment forms the northern boundary of the basin. In the Southern Rivers catchment, the Illawarra sub-catchment and the Shoalhaven sub-catchment forms the southern boundary.

See also

 Cumberland Plain
 Geography of Sydney
 Geology of Australia
 Illawarra Coal Measures
 Mittagong Formation
 Narrabeen group
 Sydney sandstone
 Wianamatta Shale

References

Attribution 
 (accessed on 25 March 2018).

External links 
 NSW National Parks and Wildlife Service – Sydney Basin Bioregion
 NSW Department of Primary Industries – Sydney Basin – Geological Overview
 NSW Office of Water – Basins and catchments

Biogeography of New South Wales
Eastern Australian temperate forests
Geography of New South Wales
Geology of New South Wales
IBRA regions
Sedimentary basins of Australia